Scaevola spicigera is a species of flowering plant in the family Goodeniaceae. It is a small, spreading shrub with white flowers and is endemic to Western Australia.

Description
The leaves narrowly oblong to elliptic to oblanceolate, usually more hairy on the lower surface, margins smooth, apex pointed, and gradually narrowing toward the base with a noticeable tuft of soft hairs.

Taxonomy and taxonomy
Scaevola spicigera was first formally described in 1990 by Roger Charles Carolin and the description was published in Telopea. The specific epithet (spicigera) means "flower spike".

Distribution and habitat
This scaevola grows on red sandy soils in grassland between Learmonth and Lake MacLeod.

References

spicigera
Flora of Western Australia